Ferdinand Theodore Yahr (December 17, 1834 – May 1, 1910) was a member of the Wisconsin State Senate.

Biography
Yahr was born on December 17, 1834 in Heldrungen, Germany. He came to Wisconsin in 1849, where he lived in Watertown, Berlin, Waupun and Princeton, Wisconsin. In 1861, he married Amelia C. Schaal. They had ten children. Yahr died on May 1, 1910 in Milwaukee, Wisconsin and was buried at Forest Home Cemetery.

Career
Yahr defeated James O. Raymond (1831–1897) in the 1890 senatorial election and served as a member of the Wisconsin State Senate from 1891 to 1893, representing the 9th District. He was also an elector for the 1892 presidential election. Yahr was a Democrat.

References

External links
	

German emigrants to the United States
Politicians from Watertown, Wisconsin
People from Berlin, Wisconsin
People from Waupun, Wisconsin
Democratic Party Wisconsin state senators
1834 births
1910 deaths
Burials in Wisconsin
19th-century American politicians